Juan Van-Halen Acedo (born 1944) is a Spanish poet, journalist, historian and politician member of the People's Party (PP). His political activity is notable in the scope of the Community of Madrid, where he chaired the presidency of the regional parliament between 1995 and 1999.

Biography 
Born on 17 June 1944 in Torrelodones. A poet coming from the intellectual falangist ranks of the Sindicato Español Universitario (SEU), he served as chief of the Cultural Activities Section of the National Delegation for Youth between 1968 and 1970.

He started a career in journalism in Ya. He later collaborated in Arriba and El Alcázar. 
He worked as correspondent in Vietnam.

He was elected member of the 2nd Assembly of Madrid within the list of People's Alliance (AP). Subsequently re-elected in the 1991, 1995, 1999, May 2003, October 2003, 2007, 2011 and 2015 regional elections representing the People's Party (PP), he served as president of the regional legislature in its 4th term (1995–1999).

He was also senator, designated by the Assembly of Madrid, between 1989 and 1995 and between 1999 and 2011.

He is a member both of the Real Academia de la Historia and the Real Academia de Bellas Artes de San Fernando.

Notes

References

Bibliography 
 

1944 births
Living people
Members of the 2nd Assembly of Madrid
Members of the 3rd Assembly of Madrid
Members of the 4th Assembly of Madrid
Members of the 5th Assembly of Madrid
Members of the 6th Assembly of Madrid
Members of the 7th Assembly of Madrid
Members of the 8th Assembly of Madrid
Members of the 9th Assembly of Madrid
Members of the 10th Assembly of Madrid
Members of the Senate of Spain
Presidents of the Assembly of Madrid
Members of the People's Parliamentary Group (Assembly of Madrid)